Colinas del Campo de Martín Moro Toledano, commonly known as Colinas del Campo or simply Colinas, is a locality in the municipality of Igüeña, in the comarca of El Bierzo, in the province of León, in the autonomous community of Castile and León, Spain.

Known officially as Colinas del Campo de Martín Moro Toledano de Castilla y León, it is the town with the longest administrative name in Spain.

References

El Bierzo
Populated places in the Province of León